Charles Bowden is a convicted Irish criminal, who after turning state's witness in the murder of journalist Veronica Guerin, was the first person to enter Ireland's Witness Security Programme.

Early life
Born in Finglas, Dublin, he left school and joined the Irish Army. Rising to the rank of corporal, he gained a black belt in karate but was dishonourably discharged after beating up a new recruit.

Criminal
Having separated from his first wife and two children and unable to pay child support, he met one of Dublin's major ecstasy dealers in a gym in Buckingham Street. Working as a doorman at the Hogan Stand public house, he started selling drugs for the gang. Leaving his doorman's job, he began distributing cannabis across Dublin for John Gilligan's gang, becoming the gang's quartermaster.

Bowden cleaned and loaded the pistol used to kill Veronica Guerin, which he believed would be used by Patrick "Dutchy" Holland only to threaten her. After the murder of Guerin, Bowden, like the other members of Gilligan's gang who were still in Ireland, was arrested.

Informant
In an agreement with the Attorney General of Ireland, he agreed to turn state's witness and become the first person to enter the country's witness protection programme. Granted complete immunity from prosecution for the murder of Guerin, he was the only witness to give evidence against all four drug gang members at their trials in the Special Criminal Court: Holland, Paul Ward, Brian Meehan and Gilligan.

Bowden was subsequently prosecuted and found guilty for drugs and firearms offences. Sentenced to six years in jail, he was held under armed protection in prison in a special secure four-cell unit at Arbour Hill Prison, alongside John Dunne and Russell Warren, who also gave evidence against the drug gang members.

It was confirmed in April 2001 by the Attorney General of Ireland's office, that Bowden had been released from jail. Following discussions with foreign state witness protection programmes, Bowden and his second wife, had been relocated abroad. The family had been provided with a house, the mortgage for which was to be paid by the state, and Bowden was given a job compatible with his abilities and education. It is an offence under Irish law to try to contact him or to publish his whereabouts.

See also
 Criminal Assets Bureau (CAB)

References

Year of birth missing (living people)
Living people
Criminals from Dublin (city)
Irish Army soldiers
Irish drug traffickers
20th-century Irish criminals
Irish male karateka